Goregrish.com is a shock site that contains uncensored images and videos of cadavers, accident victims, drug overdoses, suicides, murders, capital punishments, including decapitations, botched surgeries, necrophilia, and war crimes. It also contains other adult content.

Videos such as murders by the Dnepropetrovsk maniacs and the murder of Jun Lin by Luka Magnotta are freely available to view on the site.

The staff behind the goregrish Internet forum have been interviewed over the debate surrounding the morals of allowing such material to be shown online.

In 2017, the website was named one of "The 7 goriest and must F#(ked up sites on the web" by Inked.

Goregrish.com is banned from Google.de search results in Germany by order of the Bundestag.

The website is believed to be an offshoot of the now-defunct Uncoverreality.com shock website, which itself was an offshoot of the defunct ogrish.com shock website (later called LiveLeak.com and now redirecting to ItemFix), with many former members of both websites presently residing on the goregrish message boards.

As of December 2021, the site was inactive, with a message promising it will return, and stating "Let's Go Brandon".

As of January 2022, the site has been reactivated.

History
Goregrish was established in June 2008 under another name, pwnographic.net. It changed its name and domain to Goregrish.com in 2010.

Ngatikaura Ngati autopsy images
In October 2011, controversy arose when the autopsy images of Ngatikaura Ngati appeared on the site. The Children's Commissioner, Russell Wills was "appalled to learn that images of Ngatikaura Ngati have been used on [the] website."

References

Shock sites
Online obscenity controversies
Internet properties established in 2010